The Peter Richards Islands are members of the Arctic Archipelago in the territory of Nunavut. They are located in Baffin Island's Admiralty Inlet.

External links 
 Peter Richards Islands in the Atlas of Canada - Toporama; Natural Resources Canada

Uninhabited islands of Qikiqtaaluk Region
Archipelagoes of Baffin Island
Archipelagoes of the Canadian Arctic Archipelago